

163001–163100 

|-bgcolor=#f2f2f2
| colspan=4 align=center | 
|}

163101–163200 

|-id=119
| 163119 Timmckay ||  || Tim McKay (born 1964), American astronomer with the Sloan Digital Sky Survey || 
|-id=153
| 163153 Takuyaonishi ||  || Takuya Onishi (born 1964), a Japanese astronaut selected by JAXA in 2009, who stayed at the ISS in 2016. He is a Boeing 767 co-pilot. || 
|}

163201–163300 

|-id=244
| 163244 Matthewhill ||  || Matthew E. Hill (born 1971) is a senior scientist at the Johns Hopkins University Applied Physics Laboratory. He served as a Co-Investigator for a High Energy Charged Particles Spectrometer aboard the New Horizons Mission to Pluto. || 
|-id=255
| 163255 Adrianhill ||  || Adrian Hill (born 1964) is a software engineer at the Johns Hopkins University Applied Physics Laboratory, and served as a Fault Protection and Autonomy Lead for the New Horizons Mission to Pluto. || 
|}

163301–163400 

|-bgcolor=#f2f2f2
| colspan=4 align=center | 
|}

163401–163500 

|-id=470
| 163470 Kenwallis ||  || Ken Wallis (1916–2013), a British aviator and engineer. || 
|}

163501–163600 

|-bgcolor=#f2f2f2
| colspan=4 align=center | 
|}

163601–163700 

|-id=623
| 163623 Miknaitis ||  || Gajus Miknaitis (born 1976), American astrophysicist with the Sloan Digital Sky Survey || 
|-id=624
| 163624 Moorthy ||  || Bhasker Moorthy (born 1978), American astronomer with the Sloan Digital Sky Survey || 
|-id=625
| 163625 Munn ||  || Jeff Munn (born 1961), American astronomer with the Sloan Digital Sky Survey || 
|-id=626
| 163626 Glatfelter || 2002 UV || Pam Glatfelter (born 1955), American Operational Site Manager for the Table Mountain Observatory in California || 
|-id=639
| 163639 Tomnash ||  || Thomas Nash (born 1943), American physicist with the Sloan Digital Sky Survey || 
|-id=640
| 163640 Newberg ||  || Heidi Jo Newberg (born 1965), American astronomer and software developer with the Sloan Digital Sky Survey || 
|-id=641
| 163641 Nichol ||  || Robert Nichol (born 1966), British observational cosmologist with the Sloan Digital Sky Survey || 
|-id=693
| 163693 Atira ||  || Atira, the Native American Pawnee goddess of Earth and the evening star || 
|}

163701–163800 

|-id=800
| 163800 Richardnorton ||  || O. Richard Norton (1937–2009), author of many popular books and articles about meteorites † || 
|}

163801–163900 

|-id=819
| 163819 Teleki ||  || Sámuel Teleki (1845–1916), Hungarian explorer, first to reach the snow-line on Mount Kilimanjaro, first to set foot on Mount Kenya, first European to see Lake Turkana (which he named Lake Rudolf) || 
|}

163901–164000 

|-bgcolor=#f2f2f2
| colspan=4 align=center | 
|}

References 

163001-164000